A baboon is an Old World monkey of the genus Papio.

Baboon may also refer to:
The local name in Belize for the howler monkey
The baboon spider, an Old World Tarantula
Baboon (band), a rock and roll band from Denton, Texas 
Baboon (album), their self-titled 2006 album
Serbian medieval term for heretics
Baboon (short story collection), a 2006 short story collection by Danish author Naja Marie Aidt
I.R. Baboon, a character from the animated series I Am Weasel